Willis Marcus Keyes (born October 20, 1973) is a former American football offensive lineman who played eight seasons in the Arena Football League (AFL) with the Florida Bobcats, Carolina Cobras and Georgia Force. He was drafted by the Chicago Bears in the seventh round of the 1996 NFL Draft. He played college football at the University of North Alabama and attendede Taylorsville High School in Taylorsville, Mississippi.

College career
Keyes played college football for the North Alabama Lions. He won three NCAA Division II National Championships during his college career. He also participated in the Senior Bowl and the Blue/Grey game.

Professional career

Chicago Bears
Keyes was selected by the Chicago Bears with the 233rd pick in the 1996 NFL Draft. He was a member of the Bears from 1996 to 1997, appearing in two games during the 1996 season.

Florida Bobcats
Keyes signed with the Florida Bobcats on March 9, 2001.

Georgia Force
Keyes was a member of the Georgia Force during the 2002 off-season. He was released by the Force on April 15, 2002.

Carolina Cobras
Keyes was signed by the Carolina Cobras on April 16, 2002.

Georgia Force
Keyes was traded to the Georgia Force on October 22, 2002 for the fourth pick in the 2003 Dispersal Draft. He played for the team from 2003 to 2007, earning Second-team All-Arena honors in 2007.

Grand Rapids Rampage
Keyes signed with the Grand Rapids Rampage on October 31, 2007 and played for them during the 2008 season. He was released by the Rampage on December 2, 2008.

References

External links
Just Sports Stats

Living people
1973 births
Players of American football from Mississippi
American football offensive linemen
African-American players of American football
North Alabama Lions football players
Chicago Bears players
Florida Bobcats players
Carolina Cobras players
Georgia Force players
Grand Rapids Rampage players
People from Taylorsville, Mississippi